B. Shyam Sunder (21 December 1908 – 19 May 1975) was born in Aurangabad district in Bombay Presidency, British India. His father was B. Manicham, a railway employee,  his mother Sudha Bai and Manik bai younger sister. He was a political thinker, jurist, prolific writer, parliamentarian and a revolutionary leader. In 1937, he founded the Dalit-Muslim unity  movement at Parbhani in Aurangabad, Maharashtra and urged his people to join hands with Muslims. He was a legislator representing Andhra Pradesh and Mysore State.

In 1956, he established the "All India Federal Association of Minorities" at Hyderabad and finally organised  a movement for Bahujans in 1968 at Lucknow district in Uttar Pradesh State and formally declared that Minorities slogan "India is ours." He inaugurated 'Bhim Sena', a voluntary corps force, at Gulbarga in Karnataka State which later spread to all parts of India. V. T. Rajshekar an eminent Dalit scholar, writer and editor Dalit Voice credited him as Father of Dalits Movements in India.

Early life and education

Shyam Sunder was born on 21 December 1908 into Mala family at Aurangabad Cantt., Aurangabad district, Maharashtra, which was then part of the Nizam of Hyderabads princely state. He completed his early schooling at Aurangabad. He was greatly moved by caste ill-feelings and practice of untouchability, his agitated mind took him to Buddha's Ajanta Caves to seek solace. When his family moved to Hyderabad, he enrolled in the Osmania University, graduating in Political Science, Economics and went on to earn a law degree. He could speak Urdu, English and Marathi. He was popular among the student community and he was elected Senate and Syndicate member of the Osmania University. He entered active politics and joined the student wing of Depressed Classes Association; he was chosen as General Secretary and later became its president in 1947.

Political career

He practiced law briefly and joined the Swadeshi movement under the leadership of Smt Sarojini Naidu and served as its General Secretary to Andhra Pradesh. He was elected the President of Literary Society of Hyderabad. He accepted the membership of Exhibition Society to Hyderabad. He  was elected unopposed from Graduate Constituency, to Hyderabad Legislative Assembly and later served as its Deputy Speaker.

He was a part of the Nizam's delegation to UNO. Sri PR Venkat Swamy, who authored Our Struggle for Emancipation, says "the entry of Shyam Sunder is a red day in the history of Depressed Class Movement" and mentions he was fondly addressed as  Queid-e-Pusthakhome [Leader of Depressed Class]. The Nizam of Hyderabad conferred  Khusro-e-Deccan, highest civilian award, on Shyam Sunder for his yeoman service. Rajsheker VT editor Dalit Voice, an eminent Dalit writer, gives a graphic picture of Shyam Sunder and achievement of  Bhim Sena.

Missions of life

Shyam Sunder  was a social-political and ideological leader of the Mool Bharathis the during pre- and post-independence period. He was able to  alleviate the conscience of his brethren by making them realise they are not Untouchable but the Mool Bharathis of India; they are born Buddhist and builders of Harappan civilization  and heir apparent to rule this land.  He strove hard to provide education facilities and  fought for land reforms for his brethren. He spearheaded a movement to federate Minorities and Bahujans to fight for their legitimate constitutional rights.

We are not Hindus, we are born Buddhist

Hinduism has a practice of "untouchability", wherein certain people are Untouchable. The Father of Nation, Sri Mahatma Gandhi, fondly said they are Harijan, meaning sons of God. The Constitution of India declared they are Scheduled castes and scheduled tribes and Human Right activists say they are Dalit. Shyam Sunder, from the beginning of his political career, bluntly refuted this, saying "We are not Hindus, we have nothing to do with the Hindu caste system, yet we have been included among them by them and for them." and wisely said that Caste system is to them by them and for them.

Dalit-Muslim unity movement

Change! Change swiftly; if you do not change now you will never change!" said Shyam Sunder at the "All India Depressed Classes Association" Conference on 30–31 May 1941 at Parbhani in Aurangabad  District held under his presidency. He laid the foundation   for  Dalit-Muslim Unity Movement. It was decided in the conference that the untouchables  should abandon all the traditional activities and get themselves freed from untouchability and caste system. He read sixty-four pages printed presidential address known as Khutbe-e-Sadarat and  asked  his people to raise a banner of  militant  revolt against caste system and  join hands with the Muslims. He was a fiery pro-Muslim leader. It turned out to be  a social-cultural  movement and has contributed to the sociology of development. He was the apostle of Dalit-Muslim unity movement in India. Sheetal Markan's Blog  it has contributed for  political awareness between both communities. Indeed, it  is a great document in the history of untouchables movement, he  in detailed elucidated the history of Mool Bharathis, Indus valley civilization; a Dravidian civilization, Advent of Aryans in India; Origin of caste system, are  Mool Bharthis are adherent of Hinduism, and Aryans (Brhamins) usurpation of power from Mool Bharathis.

Contribution to education

In 1932, His Highness the Nizam of Hyderabad  set up the "One Crore Rupees Education Trus Fund"  Shyam Sunder was a trustee member for three years. To  avoid caste ill-feeling among students, the trust opened  Madarsa-e-Pushthkhome schools, residential hostels and to combat school dropout, it distributed monthly scholarships and even clothes to the students. This kind of education system was not found elsewhere in India. Dr. B. R. Ambedkar started the People's Educational Society at Aurangabad; Shyam Sunder as a trustee member gave twelve 1.2 million rupees as a grant and  five lakhs to establish  Sidharth Law college at Bombay Nizam of Hyderabad personally gave two hundred acres of land to the Society. With these donations, Milind College, the first PES institution at Aurangabad, was established. Shyam Sunder served as Executive Council Member to the Society from 1964 to 1966.

Land Reforms

Shyam Sunder realised  that land alone could bring a qualitative-quantitative change in the lives of  his brethren.  PR Venkat Swamy  recalls that he  organized a mammoth rally of landless peasants at Hyderabad. He demanded land reforms from Nizam's State government, asking his followers to encroach on government-held "Gairan" land and even surplus lands of landed gentry. Dalits occupying agricultural lands belonging to the Government and privately held properties were first noticed in this part of India. He proposed  many amendments to land reform bills in the Karnataka Assembly and his contributions are hailed. But the feudal mentality were stumbling blocks for successful land reform; thus, he went to the extent of demanding a Mool Bharathi State 'Dalitastan'.

Address to the UN Security Council

He was part of the Nizam's delegation to the UN Security Council. He is the first post-independent untouchables leader who addressed the UN security council. He, as a sole representative of the 9 million Depressed class people, formed a part of the delegation took advantage of his presence among the representative of world nations. He gave the Security Council a clear picture of the embittered strife between groups and inhuman conditions of the suppressed masses of independent India. His comparison of the pathetic plight of the depressed Classes of India to the segregation of Negros in the United States created an indelible impression in the world diplomatic parlors. He was given a place of honour everywhere, as the true representative of sixty millions "untouchables", "Unapproachable", "Unseeable" and "Unshadowable" people.

The Indian governments Operation Polo wherein  the Nizam signed an accession treaty with government occurred, and Shyam Sunder cut short his European tour and returned to India. He was kept under house arrest at his sisters house in Pune and later freed. He renewed his political activities  and contested the first General Election from Chanchal Guda constituency from Hyderabad, which he lost. He was later elected to Mysore Legislative Assembly from Bhalki constituency in Bidar district. In 1962 he contested for an Assembly seat from Åland constituency in Kalaburagi district, and  Lok Sabha seat from Bidar district, but lost both elections. After the demise of Dr. Ram Manohar Lohia  he became the president of Praja Socialist Party.

Minorities Movement

With the blessings of Sardar Master Tara Singh, on 13 October 1956 Shyam Sunder formed "All India Federal Association of Minorities" at Hyderabad. Shyam Sunder also wrote the pamphlet Federation is a must for Indian Minorities; his demands for Minorities included enforcement of their Constitutional rights, preservation of culture, electoral reforms, and even nationalisation of Administration Problems of India Minorities. His main objectives were to undertake a nationwide educative campaign in favor of secularism, to ensure that minorities were not denied their constitutional rights, and a fair deal in recruitment for civil and military appointments and admissions to educational and technical institutions. Articles 29 and 30 of the constitution of India (part III) were implemented in letters as well as in spirit so far as the minorities are concerned. He warned minorities that "the alternative before the minorities is federate or face a lingering death.". National Integration and Problems of Minorities" He specifically suggests safeguards such as effective representation of minorities in Parliament and Legislature, safety of their life and culture and re iterates the re-organisation of states and further he says prejudice and discrimination against minorities hurts the country more than its victims.

Four Immediate Needs of 12 Crore Suppressed Human beings in India

On 26 January 1968, a conference of "All India Scheduled Caste Federation" conference was held at Nanded District in Maharashtra State under the Presidency of Shyam Sunder. He thundered that the practice of Apartheid is a racial one and untouchability is religious in nature. The "ghetto apartheid" has been operation for three thousand years in India in spite of India's Constitutional provisions for Scheduled Caste has made no differences in the practice of untouchability and they are living in burning furnace and  conference  also decided to co-ordinate all political parties.

The federation put forth Four Demands: Separate settlement, separate election for them, establishment of a separate University at Milind college in Aurangabad or Siddharth College at Bombay and lastly, form an education trust funded by the government of India. The conference also demanded that the Marathwada University should be named after B. R. Ambedkar

Bhim Sena
He created Bhim Sena, a voluntary corps force, on 29 April 1968 in Gulbarga district in Karnataka on the seventy-seventh anniversary of the birth of Dr. B. R. Ambedkar. He gave Ambedkars name to Bhim Sena is a self-defense movement based on truth and non-violence.It repulsed the caste Hindus atrocities on the untouchables. A militant  force comprised about 2,00,000 Dalits. The movement was revolt against Hindu caste system. Shyam Sunder wished to create Dalitastan, a country for Untouchables, and desired an alliance between the Dalits, the Muslims and the Untouchables. For this reason, Bhim Sena became popular. The Bhim Sena movement was a caste struggle rather than a class struggle, to confront Hindus militarily. The main objectives of Bhim Sena were three-fold: twenty-five percent villages to be surrendered to them,  a separate electorate, and separate elections and a separate University for them.

Organisation

Bhim Sena should be organised on a district wise basis. The Flag of the Bhim Sena will be blue. In the centre there will be a white shining sun in which there will be likeness of the plough, the hammer and the arrow in red colour representing peasants, workers and the traves. The plough also indicates that the Scheduled Castes are the principal producers of food, the hammer indicates that they are the power behind all industrial activities, while the arrow shows that it is they who once ruled India. powers Self-defence is our main object, subsidiary activities like Prepare for census and election work, The Legal Aid Committee, Adult education.

Father of Bahujans Movement

Shyam Sunder held a  conference concerning Scheduled Caste, Minorities, Backward Classes and other Minorities Convention at Lucknow district in Uttar Pradesh on 12 and 13 October 1968. Periyar E. V. Ramasamy, Dr. Fareedi, Bhante Bhadat, and Anand Kausalyayan attended. In his presidential address he put forth several demands. He demanded remodeling of para military forces, division of bigger states like Uttar Pradesh, Rajasthan, Madhya Pradesh, Maharashtra, Andhra and Bihar into two or more states. He advocated that Minorities should be treated as corporate entities and be given autonomy to conduct  their affairs.  With one voice it declared the aqhliyataoun ka Nara Hindustan hamara. "From the platform of this convention, held in Lucknow noted for its refined composite Hindustani culture. I call upon the oppressed minority’s f the great land to wake up and unite; I warn them that if they do not, they would be annihilated one by one, group by group and section by section. And declare that united they constitute the majority and have the natural right to play an effective role in guiding the destination of  the land of their birth and I conclude by expressing on my own behalf and on behalf of this convention our profound devotion to our mother land Ahliyataouna ka nara Hindustan Hamara.In fact, this movement at Lucknow was a precursor to the Bahujan movement started by Sri Kanshi Ram.

An Appeal to UNO

He sought the UNO’s intervention to form separate country for untouchables, and appealed  for a plebiscite to elucidate the desires of members of the Scheduled Caste in regards to remaining in Hinduism, and similarly in his book They Burn. In his book They Burn  he says "The United Nations organisation and The Charter on Human Rights does provide some remedy for millions and millions of human beings. who are thus condemned to the inhuman and barbarous condition peculiar to the Untouchables of  India numbering one hundred and sixty Millions. Article 13 (B) and 55 (C) of the United Nations Charter deserve study by all champions of the exploited and the downtrodden The possibility of invoking Article 36-2- of the Statue of The International Court of Justice needs to be studied by all friends of the oppressed".

The Mool Bharathi B. Shyam Sunder Memorial Society was formed after the death of Shyam Sunder. The society has published his books and assists research students in various universities.

Books by B. Shyam Sunder

Mool Bharathis

They Burn: the 16,00,00,000 untouchables of India
The four immediate needs of twelve crores suppresses human beings in India : resolutions passed unanimously
Veda Mecum for Mool Bharatis
Bhim Sena kya Chahati hai (Urdu)
Problems of Scheduled Caste
Harijans and General Elections
Neo-Buddhist Claims as Scheduled Caste
The Plight of Scheduled Caste in India Petition to Lok Sabha
National Integration and Problems of Indian Minorities
Danger Ahead for Minorities let us Unite and Face them
Federation is a Must for Indian Minorities
Problems of Indian Minorities

On Bahujans

Presidential Address Uttar Pradesh Minorities and Backward Classes Convention (English, Urdu and Hindi)
Khutebe-e-Sadarat, Parbhani Presidential Address in (Urdu)
Deeksha (Hindi, Urdu and English)
Bhoodevataon ka Manifesto (Hindi, Kannada and Urdu)
Educational conference at Hyderabad (Urdu)
Zionist Plot to Dominate the World
Today's Muslims are Tomorrows Harijans
Interview to Meherab Urdu Digest

On Hinduism

Bhudevataon ka Manifesto (Hindi and Kannada)
UDHR Must be Honored in India
The Menace of the Dragon

References

Dalit activists
1908 births
1975 deaths
People from Aurangabad district, Maharashtra
Praja Socialist Party politicians
20th-century Indian politicians
People from Marathwada
Activists from Maharashtra